Nursel is a Zimbabwean gospel music artist based in Britain.

Background
Born Nursel Masuka in Masvingo, Zimbabwe, she attended her early education at Langham Secondary School where she started music in high school choir.

Nursel released her debut album Like Heaven in 2016 whose title track performed on Star FM Zimbabwe charts in Zimbabwe. In 2018, she released an album called You Are My God and the highlights of the album launch were featured  on the SKY TV's Digging Deep Show and Mira Ipapo track from the album went on Power FM Zimbabwe gospel charts.

Discography

Singles

Like Heaven 2016
Who Is There Like You 2016
Praise Him 2016
Friends in Christ 2017
Mira Ipapo 2018
Makomborero 2019
I believe 2019

Albums

Like Heaven 2016
You are my God 2018
Living in Victory EP 2019
The Good News 2021

Awards

Gospel Artist of the year - Zimbabwe Music and Arts Awards (ZIMAA) 2016 (nomination)
Best African Contemporary Living in Victory - Praisetek Gospel Music Awards (PGMA)
Gospel Artist of the year - Zimbabwe British Entertainment Awards 2020
Best Female Artist, Best Prophetic Song Living in Victory, Best Video Makomborero - Maranatha Gospel Music Awards USA 2021

References

External links
Official Website
Hodowla Artists on COVID 19
Gospel Ensemble Free to Worship Concert

Living people
Zimbabwean emigrants to the United Kingdom
21st-century Zimbabwean women singers
1984 births